Source London is a network of electric vehicle charging points in London..

Charging points are located in residential streets, public car parks, at supermarkets, shopping centres and similar places. Use of a Source London branded charging point requires registration with the network's website and the payment of an annual fee of £48 per vehicle.  Users are required to pay the annual subscription (also payable in monthly instalments of £4/month) along with 3.6p/min for each charging session on their modern chargers. Registered members are issued with a card that is swiped on the charging point's card reader to permit charging an unlimited number of times.

Backing and funding

First announced in November 2010 and launched on 27 May 2011 by London Mayor Boris Johnson, it is the first citywide network in London It initially provided 150 charging points across the capital with plans to expand coverage to 1,300 charging points by 2013. In 2019, 850 charging points were available with a further 2,000 planned for installation by 2020.

Source London was originally a Transport for London-led consortium of public and private sector organizations. The IT infrastructure was developed by Siemens and the network is partly funded by Scottish and Southern Energy and National Car Parks. Other organisations involved include Heathrow Airport, Gatwick Airport, Asda, Capital Shopping Centres, Sainsbury's, IKEA, Whittington Hospital, Enterprise Rent-a-Car and London Underground. The Department for Transport provided £9.3 million 50% match funding for the development of the network's infrastructure. The subscription fee for the scheme was originally an annual flat-rate £10 per vehicle, with no per-charge fees.

Bolloré's IER subsidiary took over the management of the Source London charging network from Transport for London, since 1 September 2014. Most of the actual charge points are still owned by the boroughs and business owners, and it is still their responsibility to fix faults. In January 2021, the majority shareholder changed from Bolloré's IER subsidiary to Total UK Limited.

The expansion of the network will be achieved, in part, by integrating existing charging points previously operated independently by London Borough councils. At launch, 11 boroughs had installed or were planning to install Source London charging points, or were intending to upgrade their own charging points for integration into the network. Ten other boroughs had committed to the network.

Source London is working with the Department for Transport's Office for Low Emission Vehicles and cities in the UK with the aim of developing a national charging point network.

Maintenance

In 2014 it was reported that Source London's network, formed by taking on operational responsibility for various borough's chargepoints, had problems with chargepoints being out of action. Source London says it has been working with individual boroughs to take full ownership and responsibility of the existing charging infrastructure, and has so far agreed with London Boroughs of Barnet, Brent, Bromley, Camden, Greenwich, Hackney, Hammersmith and Fulham, Hounslow, Islington, Kensington and Chelsea, Merton, Richmond, Southwark, Sutton, Wandsworth, Westminster, and with TfL.

References

External links
Source London homepage

Electric vehicles in the United Kingdom
Charging stations
Road transport in London
Commercial machines